This is a list of Greek princesses by marriage from the accession of Geórgios I to the throne of the Kingdom of Greece in 1863. Individuals holding the title of princess would usually also be styled "Her Royal Highness"  (HRH).

Elizabeth II, Queen of the United Kingdom, Marína Kárella and Irina Aleksandrovna Ovtchinnikova, while meeting most of the requirements, are not classed princesses by marriage of Greece, because Prince Fílippos, husband of Elizabeth II, renounced his Greek (and Danish) titles, Prince Michaíll had a morganatic marriage, and Prince Pétros lost his succession rights upon his marriage.

List of Greek princesses by marriage since 1863

See also
 List of princesses of Greece by birth
 List of princesses of Denmark by marriage
 Monarchy of Greece

 
Princesses
Princesses
Marriage, unions and partnerships in Greece